Misumena is a genus of crab spiders sometimes referred to as flower crab spiders. They are similar in appearance to several other genera in the family Thomisidae, such as Misumenoides and Mecaphesa.

Misumena vatia, the goldenrod crab spider, is a North American species commonly seen hunting in goldenrod (Solidago) sprays in autumn.  It can change its color between white and yellow to match the flower it is sitting on. The color change takes a few days.

Species

, the World Spider Catalog listed the following 40 species:

References

  (2008): The world spider catalog, version 8.5. American Museum of Natural History.

Thomisidae
Thomisidae genera
Cosmopolitan spiders
Taxa named by Pierre André Latreille